The Lee model for area-to-area mode is a radio propagation model that operates around 900 MHz. Built as two different modes, this model includes an adjustment factor that can be adjusted to make the model more flexible to different regions of propagation.

Applicable to/under conditions

This model is suitable for using in data collected. The model predicts the behaviour of all links that has ends in specific areas.

Coverage

Frequency: 900 MHz band

Mathematical formulation

The model

The Lee model is formally expressed as:

where,
L = The median path loss. Unit: decibel (dB)
L0 = The reference path loss along 1 km. Unit: decibel (dB)
 = The slope of the path loss curve. Unit: decibels per decade
d = The distance on which the path loss is to be calculated. 
FA = Adjustment factor.

Calculation of reference path loss

The reference path loss is usually computed along a 1 km or 1 mile link. Any other suitable length of path can be chosen based on the applications.

where,
GB = Base station antenna gain. Unit: decibel with respect to isotropic antenna (dBi)
 =  Wavelength. Unit: meter (m).
GM = Mobile station antenna gain. Unit: decibel with respect to isotropic antenna (dBi).

Calculation of adjustment factors

The adjustment factor is calculated as:

where,
FBH = Base station antenna height correction factor.
FBG = Base station antenna gain correction factor.
FMH = Mobile station antenna height correction factor.
FMG = Mobile station antenna gain correction factor.
FF = Frequency correction factor

Base-station antenna height correction factor

where,
hB = Base-station antenna height. Unit: meter (m).

or

where,
hB = Base-station antenna height. Unit: foot (ft).

Base-station antenna gain correction factor

where,
GB = Base-station antenna gain. Unit: decibel with respect to half wave dipole antenna (dBd)

Mobile-station antenna height correction factor 

where,
hM = Mobile-station antenna height. Unit: meter(m).

Mobile-antenna gain correction factor

where,
GM = Mobile-station antenna gain. Unit: Decibel with respect to half wave dipole antenna (dBd).

Frequency correction factor

where,
f = Frequency. Unit: megahertz (MHz)

See also
 Hata model
 Okumura model
 COST 231 model
 Young model
 Point-to-point Lee model

Radio frequency propagation model